Mikalah Analise Gordon (born January 14, 1988) is an American singer and eleventh-place finalist on the fourth season of American Idol. She was the second finalist eliminated on March 25, 2005.

Early life
Gordon was born in Las Vegas, Nevada, the same city as her American Idol audition. Her mother, Victoria Cavaricci, is Italian American, and her father, Rocky Gordon, is Italian and Jewish. Gordon was raised Catholic and attended St. Francis de Sales Roman Catholic School from 3rd to 8th grade. During her formative years Gordon regularly performed on stage with her father, a jazz musician who mentored his daughter, attempting to improve her versatility. Before Idol, she was with the Helen Joy Young Entertainers, sang at the White House, and worked at an oxygen bar.

American Idol
Gordon was eliminated during "Billboard #1 Hits" week, on the March 24 show. This was also the week when the show mixed up the voting numbers for three of the Top 11 contestants, Anwar Robinson, Jessica Sierra and Gordon herself. Her last song on the show was a rendition of "Love Will Lead You Back" by Taylor Dayne.

Post American Idol career
Mikalah Gordon returned to American Idol as a host for the pre-show on the fourth-season finale of American Idol, sang during the beginning medley of The Beach Boys' songs and another song with finalist Lindsey Cardinale and Babyface.

Gordon landed a guest-starring role on Fran Drescher's new sitcom, Living with Fran. She played Fran's cousin Brianna, a Broadway singer. Following an appearance on the February 24, 2006 episode of The Tyra Banks Show, Tyra Banks hired her as a Tyra Show correspondent.

Mikalah was a Co-Host of American Idol Extra for the first 2 seasons. The show gives a behind the scenes look at American Idol after the taping each week.

Mikalah appeared on NBC's Identity on April 6, 2007. She posed as an "American Idol Finalist."

Mikalah played Lila Lee, a country singer on a USO tour in Iraq under the watch of The Unit, CBS's military drama, episode "M.P.s" on October 30, 2007. She was at the American Idol season finale visiting David Cook's hometown, cheering and talking to the crowd in 2008 and performed the same activities in Kris Allen's hometown in 2009.

Gordon currently lives in Los Angeles, California.

She was a contestant on Gone Country 2, on CMT. During the show, she wrote a song called "You're Ugly When You're Drunk" which she performed in the finale.

Gordon can now be seen in multiple venues throughout the Los Angeles area weekly, performing standup comedy and singing.

Gordon released her first single, "Honey," on July 23, 2013.

Gordon performs in residency at Rose Rabbit Lie, a night club located inside the Cosmopolitan of Las Vegas.

References

External links

1988 births
American child singers
American Idol participants
21st-century American singers
American people of Italian descent
American television actresses
Living people
Musicians from Las Vegas
Singers from Los Angeles
21st-century American women singers